The Waldeck Plateau ( or Waldecker Tafelland) is a natural 'upper main unit' in the German state of Hesse between the rivers Eder and Diemel, the East Sauerland Hills in the west and the East Waldeck Basin in the east.

The unit and term Waldecker Tafel ("Waldeck Table") was coined in the 1950s because the decimal system of natural  main units and their groups in the West Hesse Highlands (main unit group 34) had not proved sufficient, because this group had more than 11 clearly separate main units. Under the serial number 340 were included the open high plateaus made of Zechstein and Bunter sandstone of the Waldeck Plain (3401) and the adjacent thickly wooded Bunter sandstone ridge of the Waldeck Forest (3402). Both landscape units are considered as independent main units.

Natural regions 
The Waldeck Plateau is divided into natural regions as follows: 

340 Waldeck Plateau (Waldecker Tafel)
3401  Waldeck Plain (Waldecker Gefilde) 
3401.0  The Red Country (Das Rote Land)  
3401.00  Upper Marsberg Plateau (Obermarsberger Hochfläche)
3401.01  Rotenlandsgrund  
3401.1  Korbacher Land  
3401.10  Berndorfer Grund  
3401.11  Korbach Plain (Korbacher Ebene)
3401.12  Goddelsheimer Feld  
3401.13  Sachsenhausen Hills (Sachsenhäuser Hügelland)  
3402  Waldeck Forest (Waldecker Wald) 
3402.0  Orpewald  
3402.1  Twiste Hills (Twister Hügelland)  3402.2  Arolsen Plateau (Arolser Platte)  3402.3  Langer Wald  3402.4  Alter Wald  

The Hessian Environmental Atlas (Umweltatlas Hessen) of the State Environment Ministry simplifies the numbering, by substituting a 0 in the first decimal place for the Waldeck Plain instead of the subscript 1, and a 2 in the decimal placed for the Waldeck Forest instead of the subscript 2. Thus the Lange Wald is number 340.13 and the Sachsenhäuser Hügelland'' is number 340.013. A disadvantage of this format is that it is not clear that it is referring to two different main units.

References

External links 
  Umweltatlas Hessen (→Natur und Landschaft→Die Naturräume Hessens bzw. Naturräumliche Gliederung) - Naturraum-Haupteinheitengruppe 34 im Umweltatlas Hessen
 Waldecker Wald und Waldecker Gefilde as a BfN landscape fact file
  der Waldecker Tafel mit Grenzen und allen wichtigen Erhebungen / Placemarks (Google Earth erforderlich)

Regions of Hesse
!Waldeck Plateau